Godfather of Harlem is an American crime drama television series which premiered on September 29, 2019, on Epix. The series is written by Chris Brancato and Paul Eckstein, and stars Forest Whitaker as 1960s New York City gangster Bumpy Johnson. Whitaker is also executive producer alongside Nina Yang Bongiovi, James Acheson, John Ridley and Markuann Smith. Chris Brancato acts as showrunner. On February 12, 2020, the series was renewed for a second season which premiered on April 18, 2021. On January 13, 2022, the series was renewed for a third season which premiered on the renamed MGM+ on January 15, 2023.

A docu-series based on the series titled By Whatever Means Necessary: The Times of Godfather of Harlem premiered on November 8, 2020.

Premise
Godfather of Harlem tells the "true story of infamous crime boss Bumpy Johnson, who in the early 1960s returned from ten years in prison to find the neighborhood he once ruled a shambles. With the streets controlled by the Italian mob, Bumpy must take on the Genovese crime family to regain control. During the battle, he forms an alliance with Muslim minister Malcolm X – catching Malcolm's political rise in the crosshairs of social upheaval and a mob war that threatens to tear the city apart."

Cast and characters

Main
 Forest Whitaker as Ellsworth "Bumpy" Johnson, a Harlem-based mob boss and the titular "Godfather of Harlem"
 Nigél Thatch (seasons 1–2) and Jason Alan Carvell (season 3) as Malcolm X, a Muslim minister in the Nation of Islam and civil rights activist
 Ilfenesh Hadera as Mayme Johnson, Bumpy's wife
 Lucy Fry as Stella Gigante, Vincent's rebellious daughter
 Kelvin Harrison Jr. as Teddy Greene (season 1), an aspiring musician and Stella's boyfriend
 Rafi Gavron as Ernie Nunzi (seasons 1–2), a violent associate of Vincent's and part of the Genovese crime family
 Antoinette Crowe-Legacy as Elise Johnson, Bumpy's heroin-addicted daughter-turned Muslim
 Giancarlo Esposito as Congressman Adam Clayton Powell Jr. (season 1; recurring season 2–present), a politician who represents Harlem in Congress
 Vincent D'Onofrio as Vincent "The Chin" Gigante (seasons 1–2; guest season 3), the mob boss of the Genovese crime family and Bumpy's main rival
 Erik LaRay Harvey as Del Chance (season 2–present; recurring season 1), one of Bumpy's most trusted enforcers
 Demi Singleton as Margaret Johnson (season 2; recurring season 1; guest season 3), Bumpy's granddaughter

Recurring

Guest

Episodes

Season 1 (2019)

Season 2 (2021)

Season 3 (2023)

Production

Development
On April 25, 2018, it was announced that Epix had given the production a series order for a first season consisting of ten episodes set to premiere in 2019. The series will be written by Chris Brancato and Paul Eckstein who will also executive produce alongside Forest Whitaker, Nina Yang Bongiovi, James Acheson, and Markuann Smith. Brancato will also act as showrunner. Production companies involved with the series include ABC Signature Studios and Significant Productions.

On June 19, 2018, it was reported that John Ridley would direct the first episode of the series.

On February 12, 2020, the series was renewed for a second season which premiered on April 18, 2021.

On January 13, 2022, the series was renewed for a third season which premiered on January 15, 2023.

Casting
Alongside the initial series announcement, it was confirmed that Forest Whitaker would star in the series as Bumpy Johnson. In September 2018, it was announced that Vincent D'Onofrio, Ilfenesh Hadera, Antoinette Crowe-Legacy, Nigél Thatch, Kelvin Harrison Jr., Lucy Fry and Paul Sorvino had been cast in starring roles. In October 2018, it was reported that Giancarlo Esposito and Rafi Gavron had joined the cast in a series regular capacity. On January 8, 2019, it was announced that Kathrine Narducci had been cast in a recurring role.

For the second season in 2021, Justin Bartha, Annabella Sciorra, Ronald Guttman, Isaach de Bankolé, Method Man, Michael Rispoli and Grace Porter were added to the cast. In May 2021, it was announced that actress Whoopi Goldberg will appear in a guest role. On July 25, Paul Sorvino died shortly before starting filming began third season, prior to recast of Frank Costello.

Filming
Principal photography for the series reportedly began in September 2018 in New York City.

Reception
For the first season, the review aggregator website Rotten Tomatoes reported a 92% approval rating with an average rating of 7.50/10, based on 25 reviews. The website's critical consensus reads: "As sharply dressed as it is smartly written, Godfather of Harlem walks familiar blocks to its own beat and makes a strong first impression." Metacritic, which uses a weighted average, assigned the season a score of 72 out of 100, based on 10 critics, indicating "generally favorable reviews".

Cheryl Kahla of The South African said: "The Godfather of Harlem is an excellent example of what modern television is capable of today. Whitaker’s character Bumpy is a drug kingpin but also just a man trying to make sense of the world and connect with his family".

Accolades

References

External links
 

2010s American crime drama television series
2020s American crime drama television series
2010s American black television series
2020s American black television series
2019 American television series debuts
English-language television shows
MGM+ original programming
Television series by ABC Signature Studios
Television series about organized crime
Works about African-American organized crime
Works about the American Mafia
Television shows set in New York City
Television series set in the 1960s
Cultural depictions of Malcolm X